Two ships of the United States Navy have been named Balch,  for Rear Admiral George Balch.

 , was commissioned in 1914 and decommissioned in 1922.
 , was commissioned in 1936 and decommissioned in 1945.

Sources
 

United States Navy ship names